New River shiner (Notropis scabriceps) is a species of ray-finned fish in the genus Notropis.

It is endemic to the New River drainage in West Virginia, Virginia, and North Carolina.

References 

 

Notropis
Freshwater fish of the United States
Fish of the Eastern United States
Freshwater fish of the Southeastern United States
Natural history of West Virginia
Fish described in 1868